A. K. M. Shamsul Haque is a Bangladesh Awami League politician and the former Member of Parliament of Kishoreganj-1.

Career
Haque was elected to parliament from Kishoreganj-1 as a Bangladesh Awami League candidate in 1996.

References

Awami League politicians
1999 deaths
7th Jatiya Sangsad members
Year of birth missing